Kardinya is a suburb of Perth, Western Australia. Previously the site of the Somerville Pine Plantation, situated on University of Western Australia (UWA) endowment land, the suburb was developed in the 1970s.

There are several recurring themes in the street names in Kardinya. Most street names are taken from the surnames of people, although Loris Way is taken from a first name. Many are named after UWA professors, architects, or administrators. Others are named after early residents, ratepayers, landowners and roads board members in the area, and some are named after local school principals, teachers and the like. A few streets are named after species of pine trees that were grown in the Somerville Pine Plantation, or species of pigs that were farmed in the area, and there is a group of streets in the suburb's east that have a "green" name theme.

List of streets in Kardinya

See also 

 List of streets in Perth
 List of streets in East Perth
 List of streets in West Perth
 List of streets in Crawley and Nedlands
 List of streets in Bayswater, Western Australia
 List of streets and paths in Kings Park

References 

Kardinya
Kardinya, Western Australia
Kardinya streets